Bombus kashmirensis is a species of bumblebee.

References

Bumblebees
Hymenoptera of Asia
Insects of India
Insects described in 1909